Lester Blackwell Granger (September 16, 1896 – January 1976) was an African American civic leader who organized the Los Angeles chapter of the National Urban League (NUL) and headed the league from 1941 to 1961.

Early life
Granger was born in Newport News, Virginia and was one of six sons. His mother was a teacher, and his father was a doctor from Barbados. He grew up in Newark, New Jersey, and graduated from Dartmouth College in 1918. He was a member of the Alpha Phi Alpha fraternity.

He served in the US Army during World War I and worked briefly for the Newark chapter of the National Urban League.

Career
In 1922, Granger was an extension worker with the Bordentown School, New Jersey's state vocational school for African American youth, in Bordentown.

In 1930, he organized the Los Angeles chapter of the National Urban League (NUL). In 1934, he led the organization's efforts to promote trade unionism among African-American workers and challenge racism by employers and labor organizations.

In 1940, Granger became the NUL's assistant executive secretary in charge of industrial relations and continued to work to integrate racist trade unions.

In 1941, illness made the executive secretary of the NUL, Eugene Kinckle Jones, no longer able to carry out duties, and Granger was appointed as Jones' successor. During his first year as the leader of the NUL, Granger led its effort to support the March on Washington proposed by A. Philip Randolph, Bayard Rustin and A. J. Muste to protest racial discrimination in defense work and the armed forces. In 1945, he began working with the Department of Defense to desegregate the military, seeing first success with the Navy in February 1946. During the Civil Rights Movement of the 1960s, he insisted that the NUL continue its strategy of "education and persuasion," which the NUL continued to support. Granger retired from the NUL in 1961 and joined the faculty of Dillard University, in New Orleans.

Among many other activities, he remained a leading figure in social work over the years, serving as president of the National Conference of Social Work in 1952. He was the first American citizen to serve in this capacity.

Death and legacy
Granger died in January 1976 in Alexandria, Louisiana.

The Tucker Foundation annually presents The Lester Granger 18 Award to a Dartmouth College graduate whose commitment to public service, social activism or nonprofit professions has been exemplary.

References

External links
Lester Granger Autograph
National Urban League
The Lester B. Granger Papers (1935-1961) are held at the Library of Congress Manuscript Division as part of the National Urban League Records (1910-1960).

1896 births
1976 deaths
People from Newport News, Virginia
People from Los Angeles
Dartmouth College alumni
United States Army personnel of World War I
Dillard University faculty